Martina Grimaldi (born 28 September 1988) is an Italian distance swimmer. She was born in Bologna. At the 2012 Summer Olympics, she competed in the Women's marathon 10 kilometre, winning the bronze medal.

Grimaldi is an athlete of the Gruppo Sportivo Fiamme Oro.

References

External links
 

1988 births
Living people
Olympic swimmers of Italy
Swimmers at the 2008 Summer Olympics
Swimmers at the 2012 Summer Olympics
Olympic bronze medalists for Italy
Olympic bronze medalists in swimming
Medalists at the 2012 Summer Olympics
World Aquatics Championships medalists in open water swimming
Italian female long-distance swimmers
Sportspeople from Bologna
Swimmers of Fiamme Oro
21st-century Italian women